Kyle Hartzell (born September 10, 1985) is a professional lacrosse player, currently playing for Cannons Lacrosse Club of the Premier Lacrosse League. He is currently the Head Lacrosse Coach for the University of Texas at Austin. He graduated from Salisbury University (D3) in 2007. Hartzell previously played for the Atlas Lacrosse Club of the Premier Lacrosse League. Kyle is playing for the NLL Expansion Team the San Diego Seals Kyle Hartzell has also played professional lacrosse for Washington, Chesapeake, Ohio, and New York in the Major League Lacrosse. Hartzell had a career high 11 goals in 2012 as a part of the Ohio Machine, as well as 22 total caused turnovers.

Playing career 
Raised in Dundalk, Maryland Hartzell primarily played soccer growing up and only began playing lacrosse as a freshman in high school, originally as an attackman. He was not recruited out of high school, first attending CCBC-Essex, where he started as a midfielder before switching to LSM. He won an NJCAA Championship in 2004, then transferring to Salisbury University, where he walked on to the lacrosse team. At Salisbury, Hartzell did not play much until his senior season, switching between midfield and defense before finding his role as a full time defenseman his senior year. He would captain the Gulls to a 23-0 season and national championship, finishing the season with 42 caused turnovers and 83 ground balls, while being named team defensive MVP, first team all league, and third team All-American.

Professionally, Hartzell has played in MLL for the San Francisco Dragons, Washington/Chesapeake Bayhawks, Ohio Machine, and New York Lizards, in NLL with the San Jose/Washington Stealth, Philadelphia Wings, and San Diego Seals, and in the PLL for Atlas Lacrosse Club and Redwoods Lacrosse Club. He won MLL championships in 2010 with Chesapeake and 2015 with New York, as well as an NLL championship in 2010 with Washington.

Internationally, Hartzell has represented the United States three times, once in box and twice in field. He won a bronze medal at the 2011 World Indoor Lacrosse Championship, a silver at the 2014 World Lacrosse Championship, and a gold at the 2018 World Lacrosse Championship.

Stats

MLL 
Reference:

PLL

NLL 
Reference:

References

Major League Lacrosse players
1985 births
Living people
Premier Lacrosse League players
San Jose Stealth players
Washington Stealth players
Philadelphia Wings players
San Diego Seals players
Chesapeake Bayhawks players
Ohio Machine players
New York Lizards players
Lacrosse players from Baltimore
People from Dundalk, Maryland
Community College of Baltimore County alumni
Salisbury Sea Gulls men's lacrosse players